Leongino Unzain Taboada (16 May 1925 – 23 March 1990) was a Paraguayan football striker.

Unzain was part of the Paraguay national football team that participated in the 1950 FIFA World Cup. During his career he played for teams like Olimpia Asunción of Paraguay and S.S. Lazio of Italy.

References

External links
 
 

1925 births
1990 deaths
People from Guarambaré
Association football forwards
Paraguayan footballers
Paraguay international footballers
1950 FIFA World Cup players
Club Olimpia footballers
S.S. Lazio players
SC Toulon players
FC Girondins de Bordeaux players
FC Rouen players
Grenoble Foot 38 players
AS Béziers Hérault (football) players
Serie A players
Paraguayan expatriate footballers
Expatriate footballers in France
Expatriate footballers in Italy